FM- and TV-mast Helsinki-Espoo is a mast located on Harmaakallio hill near Latokaski, Espoo, Finland.

When the mast was first built in 1971, its height was 303 metres (994'). Its height was increased to 326 metres (1070') in 1988, when the station was expanded, and the present mast was erected. It shares the title of third highest structure in Finland, after the Tiirismaa (in Hollola), and Haapavesi radio and TV masts. The radio mast in Kiiminki has the same height.

Controversy with regard to Soviet-occupied Estonia in the 1980s
The Helsinki-Espoo FM- and TV-mast originally used American technology, and since it also transmitted, unintentionally however, the Finnish TV broadcasts to TV sets in northern Estonia, there was a suspicion in the Soviet-occupied Estonia, and more specifically, within the Estonian Communist Party, that Americans had something to do with this FM- and TV-mast, and that it was in their interests that Finnish television broadcasts could be seen in Estonia, and that they had perhaps funded the mast. However, Sakari Kiuru, who functioned as the CEO of the Finnish state broadcasting corporation Yle during 1980–1989, stated to the Yle TV-news in February 2011, that this transmitter did not use excessive power and that the Americans had nothing to do with it: “We really needed this mast, we had to reach the interior of the country and long distances to the west and the east. It is located near the shoreline, there’s nothing more to it, and the talk that the Americans would have funded it … they had nothing to do with it, the mast was funded from the Yle budget.” Yrjö Länsipuro, who worked as the Yle correspondent in Moscow during 1981–1978, said in the same broadcast on 24 February 2011, that as far as he could recall, the Soviet Union tried to influence Yle concerning the use of the Espoo TV-mast, but the Finns had a clear answer to them: “This is what technology is like, we can’t do anything about it.”

Besides American TV series such as Dynasty and Finnish TV commercials, the Soviet authorities were annoyed at the Eurovision Song Contest being seen in Estonia. In a 2011 documentary on the song contest, an anonymous Estonian commentator said the following: “The Eurovision fan club in Estonia was secret, because Estonia was not part of the Eurovision network, the Soviet Union did not buy into Eurovision at all, so they watched Eurovision on Finnish television. It almost represented a symbol of resistance of the Soviet regime, it was almost like a window on the West. And they would have secret ‘Eurovision parties’, and it was very much seen as an illicit thing.”

Another curious episode took place in 1984, when the Soviet Union boycotted the Olympic Games that were held in Los Angeles. Many people from the Moscow elite travelled to Tallinn in order to see the games from the Finnish television, as they were not broadcast in the Soviet Union. The most popular place for them to stay was Hotel Viru.

Radio transmissions of the Helsinki-Espoo Mast

See also
List of tallest structures in Finland

References

External links
 

Towers completed in 1971
Towers completed in 1988
Communication towers in Finland
Radio masts and towers in Europe
Transmitter sites in Finland
1971 establishments in Finland